Zaïbo is a town in west-central Ivory Coast. It is a sub-prefecture of Daloa Department in Haut-Sassandra Region, Sassandra-Marahoué District.

Zaïbo was a commune until March 2012, when it became one of 1126 communes nationwide that were abolished.

In 2014, the population of the sub-prefecture of Zaïbo was 38,502.

Villages
The 3 villages of the sub-prefecture of Zaïbo and their population in 2014 are:
 Boboniessoko (21 237)
 Gamina (3 837)
 Zaïbo (13 428)

Notes

Sub-prefectures of Haut-Sassandra
Former communes of Ivory Coast